Tony Ma (born  1957 in Vietnam) is an American professional poker player.

Born Hieu Ngoc Ma, an ethnic Hoa, he moved to Southern California in 1985 and became a regular fixture on the poker circuit.

At the 1996 World Series of Poker, he collected a bracelet and $236,000 for winning the $5,000 limit hold'em event. He won a second bracelet in 2000 for the $2,000 limit hold'em event.

In 1999, Ma won Card Players' Player of the Year Award.

Ma  made the final table of the World Poker Tour  Season 1 Pro-Celebrity Invitational Tournament, finishing in 5th place.

As of 2009, his total live tournament winnings exceed $4,100,000. His 22 cashes at the WSOP account for $1,157,987 of those winnings.

Ma now resides in South El Monte with his wife and two children.

World Series of Poker bracelets

References

External links
 World Poker Tour Profile
 Hendon Mob tournament results

American poker players
Living people
Vietnamese poker players
Vietnamese emigrants to the United States
World Series of Poker bracelet winners
1950s births
People from Los Angeles County, California